Chuankou is a town and the county seat of Minhe Hui and Tu Autonomous County, northeastern Qinghai province, Western China, on the border with Yongjing County, Gansu province.

Haidong
Township-level divisions of Qinghai